UNOSAT is the United Nations Satellite Centre. It is hosted at the United Nations Institute for Training and Research (UNITAR), with the mission to promote evidence-based decision making for peace, security and resilience using geo-spatial information technologies. UNOSAT provides the United Nations funds, programmes and specialized agencies with satellite analysis, training and capacity development, at their request. UNOSAT also supports the UN Member States with satellite imagery analysis over their respective territories and provides them with training and capacity development in the use of geospatial information technologies.

Mandate 
UNOSAT is mandated to provide United Nations funds, programmes and specialized agencies with satellite analysis, training and capacity development, at their request, as well as to continue supporting Member States with satellite imagery analysis over their respective territories and to provide training and capacity development in the use of geospatial information technologies.

History 
UNOSAT was launched in 2001 as a project funded by the United Nations Office for Project Services (UNOPS). Hosted at CERN since 2002, UNOSAT expanded its activities and the Humanitarian Rapid Mapping service was established in 2003. That same year, UNOSAT starts a partnership with the International Charter Space and Major Disasters and becomes the United Nations focal point. 

UNOSAT joined UNITAR in 2009, becoming a programme unit. The same year, the rapid mapping service extends its operations to human rights contexts. 

In 2014 and 2015, the offices in Nairobi, Kenya and Bangkok, Thailand are opened, both with a regional focus. 

In June 2021, following the recommendation of the Secretary-General of the United Nations, the United Nations Economic and Social Council (ECOSOC) passes a resolution recognizing UNOSAT as the United Nations Satellite Center.

Funding 
UNOSAT is a programme of UNITAR and therefore all funding goes through the Institute. UNITAR is a project-based organization and does not receive any funds from the regular United Nations budget. The institute is financed entirely from voluntary contributions mainly from UN Member States, other UN agencies, international and Intergovernmental organization, NGOs and the private sector.

Offices 
UNOSAT’s main office is hosted at the UNITAR headquarters, in Geneva (Switzerland) and benefits from an office at CERN through its historic partnership. UNOSAT is also represented in UNITAR regional offices in New York City (US), in Bangkok (Thailand), and Nairobi (Kenya). UNOSAT also manages project related offices in the Pacific: in Fiji, Vanuatu and the Solomon Islands.

See also 

 UNITAR 
 CERN 
 United Nations

References

External links
 official website
UNITAR website

Geographical technology
Remote sensing organizations
Organizations established by the United Nations
United Nations organizations based in Geneva